Paxton Creek is a  tributary of the Susquehanna River in Dauphin County, Pennsylvania in the United States.

The name Paxton, or Paxtang, is derived the Susquehannock term "Peshtank", meaning "where the waters stand" or "the place of springs". It is born from two branches on the southern slopes of Blue Mountain to form the main stem in Lower Paxton Township. It then forms Wildwood Lake in Susquehanna Township, artificially formed in 1908 by damming the creek for recreational activities. Later, it extends downstream approximately 6.2 miles to Harrisburg as a concrete channel built in 1914 (against the wishes of Warren Manning) to mitigate urban runoff and flooding, which is common after severe storms. This urban section of the confluence has been subject to planned restoration efforts, with a 2018 study published by PennDOT stating a goal aiming to "restore the creek’s ecosystem and improve its functions and services" by reversing the negative effects of the concrete channel and its degradation.

Tributaries
Asylum Run
Black Run

See also
List of rivers of Pennsylvania

References

External links
Paxton Creek Watershed & Education Association
Indian Names data chart

Rivers of Pennsylvania
Tributaries of the Susquehanna River
Rivers of Dauphin County, Pennsylvania